Lesley Thomson may refer to:

 Lesley Thomson (lawyer),  Solicitor General for Scotland
 Lesley Thomson (novelist) (born 1958), English novelist and creative writing tutor
Les Thomson, footballer, see List of Falkirk F.C. players

See also
Lesley Thompson, rower
Leslie Thompson (disambiguation)